Chrysalis Not For Profit Ltd (trade as Chrysalis Courses) are a counselling trainer based in Bridgwater, Somerset, England. The company is set up as a not for profit organisation and operate courses from venues across the UK.

History
Chrysalis was founded in 1998, trading as Chrysalis Courses Ltd and delivering hypnotherapy and counselling courses. This was dissolved in 2014 due to the HMRC granting Chrysalis not for profit status. When a company is granted not for profit status they need to set up a completely new company entity as the previous one cannot be transferred to a not for profit company. The company was re-founded as Chrysalis Not For Profit Ltd in 2011 which is the present form of the company.

Accreditations
Chrysalis are an approved centre of Aim Awards, who in turn are an awarding body recognised by Ofqual, whose role is to maintain standards and confidence in national qualifications.  The professional accreditations include:
The National Counselling society
The National Hypnotherapy Society
NUS Extra
AIM Awards

After completing the first year of the Chrysalis course, Level 3 Certificate in Hypnotherapy and Counselling Skills, graduates have a route to the National Hypnotherapy Society’s Accredited Register. On completion of the third year of the Chrysalis course, the Chrysalis Level 4 Advanced Diploma in Psychotherapeutic Counselling, students have a route to the National Counselling Society’s Accredited Register.

Accredited Register Scheme
The Accredited Register scheme was set up by the Professional Standards Authority to enforce a set of standards that an accrediting body needs to meet in order to achieve the mark. The Authority was tasked by government as part of public safety, they make sure any register meets the standards in the following areas: governance, setting standards for registrants, education and training and managing the register. It is important that any Counsellor, Psychotherapist or Hypnotherapist when training has a route to an Accredited Register.

There are a few registers in the UK for Counselling including the National Counselling Society, British Association for Counselling and Psychotherapy and the UK Council for Psychotherapy. Chrysalis counselling students have a direct route to the National Counselling Society’s Accredited Register with course 3, however students still can use the other bodies, but this is down to each of the registers criteria. 
Currently in the UK the National Hypnotherapy Society holds the only specific Hypnotherapy Accredited register, which, Chrysalis students have a route onto. There are other accrediting bodies in hypnotherapy that use the CNHC for a route onto an accredited register. The CNHC (Complementary and Natural Healthcare Council) has registrants from various different fields, not specifically hypnotherapy.

Qualifications
Chrysalis’s courses are registered onto the RQF (Regulated Qualifications Framework) as the company became an approved center for Aim Awards. It now runs qualifications up to level 6 on the RQF. The current qualifications:

Course 1 – Certificate in Hypnotherapy and Counselling Skills, successful candidates will achieve an Aim Awards Level 3 Certificate in Hypnotherapy and Counselling Skills (RQF) 601/2244/4 
Course 2 – Diploma in Counselling Skills and Theory, successful candidates will achieve an Aim Awards Level 4 Diploma in Counselling Skills and Theory (RQF) 601/2243/2 
Course 3 – Level 4 Advanced Diploma in Psychotherapeutic Counselling, successful candidates will achieve an Aim Awards Level 4 Diploma in Therapeutic Counselling (RQF) 601/2106/3 
Course 4 – Professional Diploma in Psychotherapeutic Counselling Practice, successful candidates will achieve an Aim Awards Level 5 Diploma in Therapeutic Counselling Practice (RQF) 601/2242/0 
Course 5 – Professional Diploma in Therapeutic Counselling Informed by Research, successful candidates will achieve an AIM Awards Level 6 Higher Diploma in Therapeutic Counselling (RQF) 601/3302/8

Upon completion of a Chrysalis course, students are fully qualified to practice counselling and hypnotherapy.

Locations
The company operate courses across the UK at the following locations:

Stranmillis University College – Belfast
The Bond Company -  Birmingham
Bournemouth University
Churchill College – Cambridge
University Hall – Cardiff 
Writtle College – Chelmsford
University of Dundee
Queen Margaret University – Edinburgh
Strathclyde University – Glasgow
The Mandolay Hotel - Guildford
Hitchin Priory – Hitchin
Leeds Trinity University
Liverpool Hope University
Queen Mary University – London
University of West London
Aylesford Priory – Maidstone
Manchester University
Northumbria University – Newcastle
Sunley Conference Centre – Northampton 
Norwich City College
University of Nottingham
Oxford Brookes University
Plymouth University
Reading University
Double Tree Hotel – Sheffield
Southampton University
New College – Swindon
Field Place – Worthing

References

External links

Hypnotherapy
Health care companies of the United Kingdom